Metopius is a cosmopolitan genus of parasitoid ichneumon wasps in the subfamily Metopiinae. They lay eggs inside caterpillars of Lepidoptera that are found in leaf rolls, and the adult wasps later emerge from the pupa. Their coloring may be mimicking potter wasps. Metopius spp. make a buzzing noise when captured.

References

Ichneumonidae